The 1967–68 Algerian Championnat National was the sixth season of the Algerian Championnat National since its establishment in 1962. A total of 16 teams contested the league, with NA Hussein Dey as the defending champions.

Team summaries

Promotion and relegation 
Teams promoted from Algerian Division 2 1967-1968 
 MC Alger
 JS Djijel

Teams relegated to Algerian Division 2 1968-1969
 JSM Skikda
 MO Constantine

League table

References

External links
1967–68 Algerian Championnat National

Algerian Ligue Professionnelle 1 seasons
1967–68 in Algerian football
Algeria